Otter.ai is a Mountain View, California-based technology company that develops speech to text transcription applications using artificial intelligence and machine learning. Its software, called Otter, shows captions for live speakers, and generates written transcriptions of the speeches.

History
Otter.ai was founded as AISense in 2016 by Sam Liang and Yun Fu, two computer science engineers with a long history of working with artificial intelligence.

In January 2018, the company announced a partnership with Zoom Video Communications to transcribe video meetings after they are held. In March, the company debuted its first Otter speech translation app at Mobile World Congress. It was available for free for Google's Android and Apple's mobile products. In October, the company launched Otter for Education, a note taking tool for college students.

In March 2019, the company launched Otter for Teams, a transcription and storage product for enterprises.

In January 2020, now doing business as Otter.ai, the company announced another $10M funding round, led by Japanese mobile phone operator NTT Docomo’s Docomo Ventures.  In April, the company announced it was offering Live Notes for Zoom calls.

Technology
To develop its speech transcription technology, the company says it combined deep machine learning using millions of hours of audio recordings, which were analyzed to train the software and improve the transcription capabilities. The company says that it uses proprietary algorithms to scour the web for these usable audio segments.

In March 2018, technology news site ZDNet reported concerns about Otter's privacy policy, noting that the company could access uploaded recordings and transcriptions. In response the company updated the policy and stated that only the CTO would allow access to transcriptions after a "legitimate user request". In 2022, Politico highlighted concerns about the privacy practices of Otter after the company queried a journalist about the purpose of a meeting, transcribed through Otter, with a Uyghur activist.

AI Meeting Assistant
In February of 2023, Otter.ai launched a new AI meeting assistant called OtterPilot, which automates meetings and helps professionals save time and increase productivity. The new features include an AI-generated summary of key meeting topics, automated capture of images of slides shared during virtual meetings, and real-time meeting notes that can be shared and collaborated on. OtterPilot also includes the company's bot, Otter Assistant, which can automatically join meetings on a user's calendar and transcribe conversations. The new meeting assistant is available to all users and aims to eliminate note-taking and improve meeting productivity.

Reception

Digital media website Mashable and technology publication Fast Company named Otter one of the best apps of 2018.

References

External links

Web applications
Automatic identification and data capture
Speech recognition